Sonora Palacios is one of Chile's oldest tropical orchestras. Formed in the early 1960s, the group is one of the main exponents of Chilean cumbia and were pioneers of the style. They were the first Chilean band to record cumbia and are widely recognized for establishing the popularity of cumbia in Chile.

History

Early success 

In the 1950s, tropical music was very popular among Chileans. Then came the 1960s, a time of great change in the music scene. Along with rock and roll from the US, cumbia style from the Caribbean came to Chile. Amparito Jiménez became very popular in Chile with the song "La Pollera Colora", and in order to adapt to the new trends, tropical bands begin to include in their repertoire cumbia and rock and roll.

It was around this time that the Palacios brothers (Jorge, Patricio, Oscar, Carlos and Marty) created  "Sonora Palacios". In 1962, they recorded their first LP record with the songs "La Mafafa" and "El Caminante". In 1964, they got their first contract to work abroad and they travelled to Argentina. They returned to Chile to receive the "Laurel De Oro" award, one of the most important music prizes of that time.

In 1969, the band was awarded two other important prizes, "El Panchito de Oro" and "El Morro", thanks to their success in Chile, Argentina and other countries in South America. The airline Varie and a Yugoslavian tourist agent and producer Putnik hired them to perform in the hotels, bars and clubs in the Czech Republic (then Czechoslovakia), Germany, Italy, France, Hungary, Bulgaria, Yugoslavia and the University of Zagreb in Croatia. Once they returned to Chile they were awarded the "Silver Disc" by the Chilean branch of Philips records.

Continuing success, 1965-1980 

After the great success of their first LP, the orchestra increase their performances and become frequent guest of the show Sábado Gigante Internacional, the longest-running television variety series in history, which was then in its infancy. Because of their popularity, they were invited to take part in the first Teletón in 1978.

Also in 1978, they recorded "Candombe para José",for which they would later be awarded a "Gold Disc".

In 1979, the band performed in the "El Festival Tropical de Salsa" (Salsa Tropical Festival) in Lucerne, Switzerland and recorded "Feliz Navidad" (Happy Christmas). In 1980, despite some internal struggles, they recorded their last album with lead singer Patricio Zúñiga. The album included one of the most popular songs in Chilean popular culture, "Un año más", commonly played at every New Year's Eve party.

Internal crisis 

From now on, internal crisis would divide the orchestra. In 1982, Patricio Zuñiga, known today as Tommy Rey, left the band after 19 years. Zuñiga was well known as lead singer of the band, his voice and personal stamp were recognized throughout Chile and, with Sonora Palacios, he had helped to create what would become Chilean cumbia.

The reason given by each side for the split differ slightly, but both agree that a key factor was the conflict between the Palacios brothers, led by Marty Palacios, and the rest of the band, led by Zuñiga.

Zuñiga has said:

In the words of Marty Palacios:

Although difficult, the separation was amicable, and Sonora Palacios and Sonora de Tommy Rey (Zuñiga's band) even share some of their most emblematic songs. In 2006 they performed together in the Viña del Mar International Song Festival in Viña del Mar, Chile, proof of the friendship that exists today between the bands.

Awards 

 1989 Antorcha de Plata Viña del Mar International Song Festival
 2005 Antorcha de Plata y Oro  Viña del Mar International Song Festival
 2006 Antorcha de Plata y Oro  Viña del Mar International Song Festival
 2012, received an award from the Culture Ministry of Chile  as recognition of their extensive career of more than 60 years ("Premio Ministerio de Cultura a Don Marty Palacios por los más de 60 años de trayectoria y su aporte a la música popular")
 2013 Altazor Award for Best Popular Music album for "50 años en vivo" (50 Years of Live Shows).
 2013 Premio Presidente de la República a la Música Chilena (President of the Republic Prize for Chilean Music)

Discography 
Originally, Sonora Palacios’ record label was Phillips. Once they moved to "Star Sound" records, the original release formats of their songs was altered and grouped into new albums.

Albums recorded under Philips, 1964 -1980 
 Explosión en Cumbias - 1964
 Sonora Palacios - 1966
 Tropical - 1968
 Volumen 4 - 1971
 Volumen 5 - 1972
 Los Fabulosos - 1975
 Sonora Palacios - 1978
 Feliz Navidad - 1979
 Sonora Palacios - 1980

Albums recorded under Star Sounds 

 Una vez más - 1984
 Esta Es - 1984
 La Inimitable - 1987
 Canta Orlando Ramirez - 1988
 Tropical Internacional - 1989
 A lo Campeón - 1991
 Esta Es - 1991 (same album as that released in 1984, but with two tracks deleted: "En Un Beso La Vida" and "Safari")
 Una Vez Más - 1991? (same album as that released in 1984, but with two tracks deleted: "Sentimental" and "Mi Esperanza")
 Más Éxitos Tropicales - 1992

Albums recorded under Calipso Records 
 La Única - 1994
 Nuestros Grandes Éxitos Vol. 1 - 1995
 Nuestros Grandes Éxitos Vol. 2 - 1996
 Éxitos '97 - 1997
 Éxitos de Oro - 1999
 Éxitos 2000 - 2000

More recent albums 
  40 Años de Éxitos - 2004 (Sony Music Chile).
 45 Años haciendo bailar a todo Chile - 2007 (Guyani Producciones).
 Super Éxitos - 2009 (Universo Producciones).
 Los Inolvidables y Nuevos Éxitos - 2009 (Guyani Producciones).
 Cumbia del Casamiento recorded along Sexual Democracia.
 Nuevo Éxitos - 2010 (Guyani Producciones)
 50 Años - 2011 (Feria Mix).
 Two song recorded with Chico Trujillo: ("Negra Santa", "El Caminante").
 50 Años (en vivo) - 2012 (Plaza Independencia).
 Yo también canto Cumbia - 2013 (Plaza Independencia)
 (2013) several records with different Chilean singers: Zalo Reyes, Jose Alfredo Fuentes, Maria Jose Quintanilla, Claudio Escobar, Miguel Barriga, German Casas, Juan David Rodriguez, Rodolfo Navech, Leandro Martinez.

Most popular songs 

 Los Domingos (La Peineta), 1964
 El Galeón Español, 1978
 El Caminante, 1963
 La Mafafa, 1963
 Pedacito de Mi Vida, 1978
 Cumbia Para Adormecerte, 1964
 Candombe Para José, 1978
 Agua Que No Has de Beber (Loco, Loco), 1978
 La Arañita, 1978
 Negrito Cumbá, 1978
 Señora (bolero), 1972

List of vocalists 
 Patricio Zuñiga "Tommy Rey", 1964 - 1980
 Orlando Ramirez, 1984 - 1988; returned 1994
 Luis Eyzaguirre, 1986 - 1993 ; returned 1997 to 2000
 Manuel Rojas, 1991 - 1993
 Pilo Mendez, 1989 - 1991
 Manuel Palacios, 1994 - 2000; returned 2010
 Julio Palacios, 2003 - 2008
 Jose Mendoza, 2009 - 2014
 Rodrigo Cardenas, 2011 to date
 Camilo Sepulveda, 2013 to date

See also 
 New Chilean cumbia

References

External links 
 Sonora Palacios Website
 universotropical records
 Sonora Palacios history
 

Chilean musical groups

Orquesta Huambaly
Ritmo y Juventud
Los Peniques
Tommy Rey
Un año más